Pukekohe Association Football Club is an association football (soccer) club in Pukekohe, New Zealand.

Pukekohe AFC currently play in 8 Senior leagues across both Men's and Women's competitions. All teams compete in Auckland Football Federation competitions, except for both Men's and Women's First teams. The Men's First team currently play in an Auckland Football Federation & Northern League Conference competition, and the Women's Premier team compete in the Northern League Women's Premier.

Current senior teams 

Pukekohe AFC currently competes in the following competitions.

Men

2013 

In 2013, Pukekohe AFC competed in 6 divisions within the Auckland Football Federation. The 6th team competed in the ASFA 2013 Division 7, a Sunday League team.

The Senior Mens First team entered the 2013 Counties Cup – a knockout tournament played over a number of weeks from teams in the Counties Manukau district. After beating South Auckland Rangers 2–0 away and Otahuhu Utd. 2–2 (4–2 PENS) at home they made it into the final for the first time in 8 years. Pukekohe AFC lost the final to Papakura City FC 6–1 at Michaels Ave. Reserve, Auckland, on 7 September 2013.

*Joe Morris took over as First Team coach during the season, with Andrew Bond taking over the coaching role with the Reserves team

2012 

In 2012, Pukekohe AFC competed in 5 divisions within the Auckland Football Federation.

Women

2013 

In 2013, the Women's Premier team won the Lotto NRFL Women’s Premier League Plate, with a 2–0 win over Lynn-Avon United AFC in the Final. It was held on 25 August 2013 at Pukekohe High School fields. Laura Johnstone and Hannah Kraakman scored Pukekohe AFC's goals.

2012 

In 2012, Pukekohe AFC had its first New Zealand Football Representative. Courtney van Lieshout debuted for the New Zealand women's national under-17 football team on 11 April 2012 against New Caledonia Under 17 team in the Oceania Football Confederation Women's U-17 World Cup Qualifiers held at Mangere Park in Auckland, New Zealand. van Lieshout then went on to play as a substitute against Mexico women's national under-17 football team in the 2012 FIFA U-17 Women's World Cup in Azberbaijan. Mexico won the match 1–0.

Awards 

 2012 – New Zealand Football Whole of Football Plan – Club of the Year
 2012/2013 – Greater Auckland Coaching Unit (GACU) Recognition through Innovation Award
 2013 – New Zealand Football Quality Club Mark Level 1

External links 
Club website

References 

Association football clubs in New Zealand
1960 establishments in New Zealand